Krakatoa is a 1933 American Pre-Code short documentary film produced by Joe Rock. It won the Academy Award in 1934 for Best Short Subject (Novelty). Educational Pictures (or Educational Film Exchanges, Inc.) was the film distributor of the film.

This film was notable for overwhelming the sound systems of the cinemas of the time. In Australia, the distributors insisted on a power output of 10 watts RMS as a minimum for cinemas wishing to show the film. This was then considered a large system, and forced many cinemas to upgrade. A revised version was made in 1966 for the Library of Congress.

Synopsis
The story describes how the 1883 eruption of Krakatoa on the island blew half of the large island into the air that produced a tsunami, and an air wave that was felt seven times around the globe. The eruption also emitted tons of dust that dimmed the sun all over the world for many months.

See also
 Krakatoa documentary and historical materials

References

External links

1933 films
1933 documentary films
1930s short documentary films
American short documentary films
American black-and-white films
Black-and-white documentary films
Documentary films about volcanoes
Documentary films about Indonesia
Educational Pictures short films
Krakatoa
Live Action Short Film Academy Award winners
1930s American films